Lochan na h-Achlaise in Scottish Loch of the Armpit, is an irregular shaped, somewhat triangular or heart shaped, freshwater loch on Rannoch Moor, Argyll and Bute in the Scottish West Highlands, within the Highland council area of Scotland.

References

Achlaise
Achlaise
Tay catchment
Lochaber